The Twin Creek Formation is a geologic formation in Idaho, United States. It preserves fossils dating back to the Jurassic period.

See also

 List of fossiliferous stratigraphic units in Idaho
 Paleontology in Idaho

References
 

Jurassic Idaho
Jurassic geology of Wyoming